Eleonora Duse is a 1947 Italian biographical film directed by Filippo Walter Ratti and starring Elisa Cegani, Rossano Brazzi and Andrea Checchi. It portrays the life of the celebrated Italian actress Eleonora Duse (1858–1924). The film was based on the novel La grande tragica by Nino Bolla.

Cast
 Elisa Cegani as Eleonora Duse  
 Rossano Brazzi as Arrigo Boito  
 Andrea Checchi as Tebaldo Checchi  
 Giovanni Grasso as impresario Schurman  
 Manoel Roero as Martin Cafiero  
 Fosca Freda as Nina  
 Fedele Gentile as Rosaspina 
 Alfredo Salvatori as Gabriele D'Annunzio  
 Bruno Corelli    
 Attilio Torelli
 Ingrid Hanussen

References

Bibliography 
 Parrill, William. European Silent Films on Video: a Critical Guide. McFarland & Co., 2007.

External links 
 

1947 films
1940s biographical drama films
1940s historical drama films
Italian biographical drama films
Italian historical drama films
1940s Italian-language films
Italian black-and-white films
Biographical films about actors
Films set in the 19th century
Films based on Italian novels
1947 drama films
Cultural depictions of Gabriele D'Annunzio
Cultural depictions of Italian women
1940s Italian films